Marnee Carpenter (born July 30, 1990) is an American actress. She was raised in Warwick, Rhode Island, and currently resides in Los Angeles, California. She majored in theater arts at the University of Miami and studied acting at the Upright Citizens Brigade Theatre in Manhattan.

Career

Carpenter's credits include the television series Criminal Minds and Good Girls (2018), the indie film Wild Oats (2016) with Jessica Lange and Shirley MacLaine, and the short comedy film Urges (2020).  In 2021 she appeared as Catherine Martin in the television series Clarice. In 2011, she appeared in the music video for Rodney Atkins' song Take a Back Road.

In 2020, Carpenter starred in the feature psychological thriller film Painter as an Art Student.

Personal life

Carpenter supports rescue dogs, including fostering and supporting adoptive families through charitable organizations such as The REAL Bark, A Purposeful Rescue, Frosted Faces Foundation, Paws for Life K9 Rescue and Angel City Pit Bulls.

Filmography

External links
 
 ok9consultation on Instagram
 Cast member of Urges (2020)

References

21st-century American actresses
Actresses from Los Angeles
American film actresses
American television actresses
People from Warwick, Rhode Island
Living people
1990 births